The SEABA Championship for Women is a basketball tournament for women's national teams organized by the Southeast Asia Basketball Association, a sub-zone of the FIBA Asia. It serves as a qualifier for different zone and subzone competitions such as FIBA Asia Championship for Women and Southeast Asian Games.

Summary

Medal table

References

 
Women's basketball competitions in Asia between national teams
1995 establishments in Southeast Asia
Recurring sporting events established in 1995
Biennial sporting events